Schrankia nokowula is a species of moth of the family Erebidae first described by Jeremy Daniel Holloway in 1977. It is found on Vanuatu in the South Pacific Ocean.

References

Moths described in 1977
Hypenodinae